Balkan Region is the westernmost of the five regions of Turkmenistan. Clockwise from north it borders Kazakhstan, Uzbekistan (north); two provinces of Turkmenistan (east), Iran (south), and the Caspian Sea (west). The capital city is Balkanabat, formerly known as Nebit Dag. The region's boundaries are identical to those of the former Krasnovodsk Oblast' , a Soviet-era province of the Turkmen Soviet Socialist Republic. This oblast was liquidated and restored repeatedly in the 20th century, concluding with its abolition in 1988. However, the administrative boundaries of the region were restored in 1991 when Balkan Region was established.

The province covers 139,270 square kilometers and counts 553,500 residents (2005 estimate).  A large minority of these are nomadic herding families. Its population density of 3.97 persons per square kilometer is the lowest in Turkmenistan.

Other cities include: Bereket, Türkmenbaşy, Gumdag, Serdar, Hazar, Etrek, and Esenguly.

Balkan Region has significant hydrocarbon reserves, which in 2019 accounted for 13.9% of Turkmenistan's natural gas production and 93.1% of its petroleum production. It also generated 15.4% of the country's electric power. Due to the very low water supply, agriculture is negligible, and only 4.5% of Turkmenistan's arable lands are within the province.

Off its Caspian shores, the Balkan Region includes the island of Ogurja Ada, the most important island in Turkmenistan and one of the largest in the Caspian Sea.

Etymology

One conjecture holds that Balkan comes from Bal akan meaning “where the honey flows”, possibly relating to the locally rich petroleum sources. However, Atanyyazow explains,This name is derived from the Balkan word meaning "mountain" in ancient Turkic languages (Khasanov, p. 47) - compare the Balkan mountains in Bulgaria. In the Turkic language, it is also used to mean "mountain", "mountain-top mountains" (1 Uretsko-Russian. Sl. M, 1931, p. 110). In the dictionaries of Budagovyts and Gadlovyts, it also occurs in the same sense. This ancient name, which existed in the early 11th century, is interpreted by local elders as "honey flowing"...

Administrative subdivisions

Districts
Balkan Province (Balkan welaýaty) is subdivided into 6 districts (etrap, plural etraplar):

 Bereket (previously Gazanjyk)
 Esenguly (previously Hasan-Kuli)
 Etrek (previously Gyzyletrek)
 Gyzylarbat (from 1999 to 2022 called Serdar)# Gyzylarbat (from 1999 to 2022 called Serdar)
 Magtymguly (previously Garry Gala)
 Türkmenbaşy

In addition, part of the city of Turkmenbashy is subdivided into a borough with district status and thus a presidentially appointed mayor.

 City Boroughs of Türkmenbaşy City:
 Awaza etraby

The former Kenar Borough (Kenar etraby) of the city of Turkmenbashy was abolished effective 9 November 2022.

Municipalities
As of January 1, 2017, the province included 10 cities (города or şäherler), 13 towns (посёлки or şäherçeler), 33 rural or village councils (сельские советы or geňeşlikler), and 112 villages (села, сельские населенные пункты or obalar). Two cities, Gumdag and Hazar, were downgraded to town status in November 2022, reducing the number of cities to eight and increasing the number of towns by two. The town of Garagöl was annexed by the town of Hazar, bringing the number of towns to 14.

In the list below, cities with "district status" are bolded:

Balkanabat (formerly Nebit-Dag)
Bereket (formerly Gazanjyk)
Esenguly (formerly Hasan Kuli)
Etrek (formerly Gyzyletrek)
Garabogaz (formerly Bekdaş)
Gyzylarbat (from 1999 to 2022 called Serdar) 
Magtymguly (formerly Garrygala) 
Türkmenbaşy City (formerly Krasnovodsk)

Industry
From 2017 to 2019, Balkan Province produced these volumes of industrial products:
{| class="wikitable"
|
|2017
|2018
|2019
|-
|Electricitymillion kwh
|5,106.3
|4,757.6
|3,474.3
|-
|Oil  (including gas condensate)thousand tonnes|10,237.9
|10,120.9
|9,146.4
|-
|Natural  gasbillion m3
|10.5
|10.5
|9.7
|-
|Gasolinethousand tonnes
|1,828.1
|1,830.1
|1,707.6
|-
|Kerosenethousand tonnes
|551.6
|567.9
|477.4
|-
|Diesel  fuelthousand tonnes
|1,897
|1,182
|1,745
|-
|Bunker  oilthousand tonnes
|623
|854.5
|674
|-
|Sodium sulfatethousand tonnes
|3.1
|1.5
|0.3
|-
|Cementthousand tonnes
|888.2
|731.2
|402.6
|-
|Building  bricksmillion
|6.2
|6.8
|9.7
|-
|Saltthousand tonnes
|94.1
|94.2
|94.3
|}

Turkmenistan's largest petroleum refinery is in the city of Turkmenbashy (viz.)''.

The Balkan Cement Plant in Jebel was built in 2011 by Turkish firm Polimeks and has a design capacity of one million tons per year.

The Kiyanly Polymer Factory, inaugurated October 17, 2018, features design capacity to produce 381 thousand tonnes of polyethylene and 81 thousand tonnes of polypropylene per year.  Built at a cost of $3.4 billion by LG International, Hyundai Engineering, Toyo Engineering, and Gap Inşaat  (a subsidiary of Çalık Holding), the plant cracks methane and ethane for production of polymers.  In the first ten months of 2019, however, the factory produced only 67,900 tonnes of polyethylene and 12,700 tonnes of polypropylene.

The $1.3 billion Garabogaz urea (carbamide) plant, built by Mitsubishi Heavy Industries and GAP İnşaat, was inaugurated on September 18, 2018, with a design capacity of 1.16 million tonnes of urea per year.  Between January and October 2019, the Garabogaz plant produced approximately 392,000 tonnes of urea, of which 261,000 tonnes was exported. 

Three factories produce iodine in Turkmenistan, all in Balkan Province: one each in Balkanabat, Hazar, and Bereket.  The Bereket plant is designed to produce 150 tonnes per year of iodine.  Following planned renovations and upgrades, the Balkanabat and Hazar plants will have design capacities of 250 tonnes and 300 tonnes of iodine, respectively, plus 2400 tonnes and 4500 tonnes of bromine, respectively, per year.  Total production of iodine in 2019 was 681.4 tonnes.

Transportation
The M37 highway begins at the Turkmenbashi International Seaport and leads eastward 1200 kilometers in the direction of Ashgabat, Mary, Türkmenabat, and the border with Uzbekistan. A network of paved roads connects major population centers, including the P-15, P-16, P-17, P-18, and P-20 highways. Passenger and car ferry service is available between the seaport in Turkmenbashy and Baku. A major airport is located in Turkmenbashy, and smaller airports are located in Balkanabat, Etrek, Garabogaz, Hazar, and Jebel. A military airfield is located at Ýangyja.

The Trans-Caspian Railway begins in Turkmenbashy and extends eastward to Uzbekistan via Ashgabat, Mary, and Turkmenabat.  The International North–South Transport Corridor passes through Balkan Province and intersects the Trans-Caspian Railway at Bereket, which features a large locomotive depot and repair works.

In addition to the seaport at Turkmenbashy, smaller vessel-loading facilities are found at Garabogaz (urea) and Gyýanly (polymers).  Turkmenbashi International Seaport operates oil-loading terminals at Alaja, Ekerem, and Kenar, and Dragon Oil loads oil at the port of Hazar.

See also
 Balkan newspaper
 Cave of Dzhebel
 Gyzylbaýyr
 Hojagala
 Jebel
 Ogurja Ada
 Türkmenbaşy Gulf
 Türkmenbaşy şäherçesi
 OpenStreetMap Wiki: Balkan Province
 OpenStreetMap Wiki: Districts in Turkmenistan

References

Links 

 Tourism in Balkan Province

 
Regions of Turkmenistan